The 1966 Baltimore Orioles season involved the Orioles finishing first in the American League with a record of 97 wins and 63 losses, nine games ahead of the runner-up Minnesota Twins. It was their first AL pennant since 1944, when the club was known as the St. Louis Browns. The Orioles swept the NL champion Los Angeles Dodgers in four games to register their first-ever World Series title. The team was managed by Hank Bauer, and played their home games at Memorial Stadium. They drew 1,203,366 fans to their home ballpark, third in the ten-team league. It would be the highest home attendance of the team's first quarter-century at Memorial Stadium, and was eclipsed by the pennant-winning 1979 Orioles.

Offseason
 October 12, 1965: John Orsino was traded by the Orioles to the Washington Senators for Woodie Held.
 November 29, 1965: Ron Stone was drafted from the Orioles by the Kansas City Athletics in the 1965 rule 5 draft.
 December 2, 1965: Norm Siebern was traded by the Orioles to the California Angels for Dick Simpson.
 December 6, 1965: Darold Knowles and Jackie Brandt were traded by the Orioles to the Philadelphia Phillies for Jack Baldschun.
 December 9, 1965: Milt Pappas, Jack Baldschun, and Dick Simpson were traded by the Orioles to the Cincinnati Reds for Frank Robinson.
 March 10, 1966: Lou Piniella was traded by the Orioles to the Cleveland Indians for Cam Carreon.

Regular season
Right fielder Frank Robinson, acquired via trade from the Cincinnati Reds in the off-season, won the Triple Crown, leading the AL with a .316 average, 49 home runs, and 122 RBI. He was named winner of the American League MVP Award, becoming the first player in the history of Major League Baseball to win MVP honors in both the American and National Leagues.

On May 8, 1966, Frank Robinson hit a 540-foot home run off Cleveland Indians pitcher Luis Tiant, becoming the only player to hit a fair ball out of Memorial Stadium. It cleared the left field single-deck portion of the grandstand. A flag was later erected near the spot the ball cleared the back wall, with simply the word "HERE" upon it.

Season standings

Record vs. opponents

Opening Day starters
Luis Aparicio
Paul Blair
Curt Blefary
Wally Bunker
Andy Etchebarren
Davey Johnson
Boog Powell
Brooks Robinson
Frank Robinson

Notable transactions
 May 21, 1966: Roger Freed was signed by the Orioles as an amateur free agent.
 June 13, 1966: Jerry Adair was traded by the Orioles to the Chicago White Sox for Eddie Fisher and minor leaguer John Riddle.
 July 1, 1966: Ron Stone was returned to the Orioles by the Kansas City Athletics.

Roster

Player stats

Batting

Starters by position
Note: Pos = Position; G = Games played; AB = At bats; H = Hits; Avg. = Batting average; HR = Home runs; RBI = Runs batted in

Other batters
Note: G = Games played; AB = At bats; H = Hits; Avg. = Batting average; HR = Home runs; RBI = Runs batted in

Pitching

Starting pitchers
Note: G = Games pitched; IP = Innings pitched; W = Wins; L = Losses; ERA = Earned run average; SO = Strikeouts

Other pitchers
Note: G = Games pitched; IP = Innings pitched; W = Wins; L = Losses; ERA = Earned run average; SO = Strikeouts

Relief pitchers
Note: G = Games pitched; W = Wins; L = Losses; SV = Saves; ERA = Earned run average; SO = Strikeouts

1966 World Series

Awards and honors
 Frank Robinson, AL Most Valuable Player Award
 Frank Robinson, Associated Press Athlete of the Year
 Frank Robinson, Triple Crown Winner
 Frank Robinson, Babe Ruth Award
 Frank Robinson, World Series Most Valuable Player Award
 Brooks Robinson, All-Star Game MVP
 Gold Glove Awards
Brooks Robinson, third base
Luis Aparicio, shortstop

Farm system

LEAGUE CHAMPIONS: Elmira

Notes

References

1966 Baltimore Orioles at Baseball Reference
1966 Baltimore Orioles season at Baseball Almanac

External links
 1966 Orioles Roster through Baseball Cards – OriolesCards.com

Baltimore Orioles seasons
Baltimore Orioles season
American League champion seasons
World Series champion seasons
Baltimore Orioles